The majority of material in this article has been sourced from the Dictionary of National Biography.
Michael Valentine Guybon Glenny (26 September 1927, London – 1 August 1990, Moscow) was a British lecturer in Russian studies and a translator of Russian literature into English.

Life

Glenny was born on 26 September 1927 in London, the only child of Arthur Glenny, an RAF officer, and Avice Noel (née Boyes), a South African ambulance driver in the Second World War. After preparatory school in Suffolk, he went to Radley College and Christ Church, Oxford. He obtained a second-class degree in Russian and French, graduating in 1951.

During his stint with the military under National Service, he pursued postgraduate studies in Soviet studies at Oxford University.

Career

Military
Following his undergraduate studies, Glenny joined the Royal Horse Guards for his national service. Ranked captain, he was posted to West Berlin in 1951. He considered a career in the military as well as in intelligence, but these did not come to fruition. He was discharged from the army in 1954 and came back to London. Glenny began his career in insurance. He then joined the Wedgwood company as a salesman and export manager. When the Wedgwood Room in the royal palace at Tsarskoye Selo was being restored in the 1960s, he was invited to the Soviet Union as an advisor.

Journalism
In 1964 Glenny joined The Observer in London to manage advertising and special projects. In 1966, the newspaper organised the Masada Exhibition at the Royal Festival Hall; he was the manager in charge of it.

Academic
Glenny was a lecturer in Russian language, literature and history at Birmingham University from 1972-75. Between 1975-77, he was a visiting lecturer at the Southern Illinois University where he collaborated with Herbert Marshall on the translation of Sergei Eisenstein's writings on drama theory. He worked at Bristol University from 1977–84.

Literary
Glenny began working as a part-time translator during his stint with Wedgwood. Via the publisher George Weidenfeld, his first published translations were from the German. However, translations from the Russian became the main focus of his life. Indeed, his speciality was the discovery and transmission of contemporary Russian literature that was unavailable to an English readership. His landmark translation of Mikhail Bulgakov's The Master and Margarita in 1967 established his fame. He followed up with several other Bulgakov novels.

Glenny made several trips to the Soviet Union in his search for significant works for translation. An early work by Alexander Solzhenitsyn The First Circle came out in translation in 1968 by Michael Guybon; it was later revealed that this was the pen name of a trio of translators: Glenny, Max Hayward and Manya Harari. His translation of Yuri Trifonov's The House on the Embankment was well received.

He was instrumental in bringing to public attention the works of Russian émigré and exiled writers such as Georgy Vladimov, Zinovy Zinik, and Vasily Aksyonov. Glenny co-authored, with Norman Stone, an oral history of the experiences of Russian emigres, titled The Other Russia, for which he also conducted many of the interviews. One of his most monumental works was the translation of Boris Yeltsin's memoirs, 100,000 words of text, which he accomplished in two months in 1990.

Significant among his interests was theatre. Following the Chernobyl disaster, Vladimir Gubaryev's play Sarcophagus came out in September 1986. Glenny obtained a copy of the script and translated it, and it was staged by the Royal Shakespeare Company at the Barbican Centre in 1987. Glenny's Five Plays from the Soviet Union came out in 1989.

At the time of his death in Moscow in 1990, Glenny was researching the works of Soviet writers who had perished in the gulags, and was awaiting documents from the KGB.

Personal life/death
Glenny married Juliet Mary Crum in 1952 with whom he had a daughter and three sons (one of whom is Misha Glenny, a journalist, writer and broadcaster). The marriage ended in 1972. Glenny married Valery Forbes Hartley-Brewer in 1975.

Glenny died on 1 August 1990 in Moscow after suffering a heart attack. He is interred at Paston, near North Walsham, Norfolk.

Select bibliography

Drama and theory

Memoir

Literature

References

Citations
 

1927 births
1990 deaths
Writers from London
Russian studies scholars
Alumni of Christ Church, Oxford
People educated at Radley College
Royal Horse Guards officers
Academics of the University of Birmingham
Academics of the University of Bristol
20th-century British translators
Military personnel from London